Georg Gilgenreiner (born 28 August 1948) is a former international speedway rider from Germany.

Speedway career 
Gilgenreiner was champion of West Germany in 1980 at the German Individual Speedway Championship.

He reached the final of the Speedway World Pairs Championship in the 1981 Speedway World Pairs Championship. He has also reached the final of the Individual Speedway Long Track World Championship on two occasions in 1981 and 1982.

World Final appearances

World Pairs Championship
 1981 -  Chorzów, Silesian Stadium (with Egon Müller) - 7th - 3pts

World Team Cup
 1981 -  Olching, Speedway Stadion Olching (with Egon Müller / Karl Maier / Georg Hack) - 3rd - 28pts (5)
 1982 -  London, White City Stadium (with Karl Maier / Georg Hack / Egon Müller / Alois Wiesböck) - 3rd - 18pts (1)

World Longtrack Championship
 1981 –  Gornja Radgona 4th 19pts
 1982 –  Esbjerg 4th 15pts

References 

1948 births
German speedway riders
People from Bad Tölz-Wolfratshausen
Sportspeople from Upper Bavaria
Living people